Emanuele Ottolenghi, a political scientist, is a Senior Fellow with the Foundation for Defense of Democracies in Washington, DC. Previously, he ran the Brussels-based AJC Transatlantic Institute. He has taught at the Oxford Centre for Hebrew and Jewish Studies, as well as the Middle East Centre of St. Antony’s College, Oxford. He earned a Ph.D. from the Hebrew University and an undergraduate degree from the University of Bologna.

Ottolenghi has written about Middle East issues for Commentary, The Daily Mirror, The Guardian, National Review Online, Newsday, the Jewish Chronicle, and the Middle East Quarterly, as well as European publications: Corriere del Ticino, il Foglio, Libero, Il Riformista, Liberal, Standpoint, L'Unità, and Die Welt.

He has expertise on antisemitism, Iran, Israel, Italy, and terrorism. He is the author of five books:

 The Pasdaran: Inside Iran's Islamic Revolutionary Guards Corps (Washington, FDD Press: 2011).
 Iran: the Looming Crisis (London, Profile Books: 2010).
 Under a Mushroom Cloud: Europe, Iran and the Bomb (London, Profile Books: 2009).
 La Bomba Iraniana (Turin, Lindau: 2008).
 Autodafe': L'Europa, gli ebrei e l'antisemitismo (Turin, Lindau: 2007).

References

21st-century Italian Jews
University of Bologna alumni
Hebrew University of Jerusalem alumni
Italian political scientists
Living people
Academics of the Oxford Centre for Hebrew and Jewish Studies
Year of birth missing (living people)